Alexander Sheftelyevich Ghindin (born 17 April 1977, Moscow) is a Russian pianist. He won first prize at the Cleveland International Piano Competition in 2007.

References

External links 
 

Living people
1977 births
Russian classical pianists
Male classical pianists
Cleveland International Piano Competition prize-winners
21st-century classical pianists
21st-century Russian male musicians